Nikos Papathanasis ((born Kallithea, Athens, 1960) is a Greek politician and is currently the Alternate Minister of Development and Investments in the Cabinet of Kyriakos Mitsotakis.

Biography 
He was born in 1960 in Kallithea, Athens. He studied mechanical engineering at the University of Toronto and did postgraduate studies in business administration and aeronautics.

He was a member of the Board of Directors. of the Hellenic Aerospace Industry (EAB) from 1989 - 1991, deputy general manager at Olympic Aviation from 1991 - 1993, managing director of Athens–Piraeus Electric Railways ISAP in the period 2005 - 2009, president of the Center of Greek Public Enterprises and Public Interest Organizations (KEDEO) from 2008-2010, as well as president of STASY SA, from 2012-2014.

Politics 
In 2016, he was appointed general director of New Democracy. On July 8, 2019, he was appointed Deputy Minister of Development and Investments, responsible for Industry and Trade, in the Ministry of Development and Investments of the Government of Kyriakos Mitsotakis.

On August 4, 2020, he was promoted to Deputy Minister of Development and Investments, responsible for Private Investments and Public-Private Partnerships.

References

External links 

 Official Website 

1960 births
Greek government-debt crisis
Greek MPs 2019–2023
Living people
New Democracy (Greece) politicians
Politicians from Athens